Four ships of the Royal Navy have been named HMS Pert:

, a brig sloop, formerly the French privateer Bonaparte captured in 1804. She was wrecked in 1807.
,  a brig sloop, formerly the French Serpent captured in 1808. She was broken up in 1813
, a  launched in 1856 and broken up in 1864.
, a  launched in 1868 and sold in 1888.

References

Royal Navy ship names